The Monte San Petrone massif is a chain of mountains in the northeast of the island of Corsica, France.
It takes its name from Monte San Petrone, the highest peak.

Geography
The Monte San Petrone massif is the highest of the three medium mountain massifs in Corsica. 
Its highest point is Monte San Petrone with its  height.
It is located to the east of the Monte Cinto massif.
Roughly corresponding to the Castagniccia region, it is the southern part of the Corse schisteuse or Corse alpine.
To the east it borders the coastal plain and the Tyrrhenian Sea.
To the southwest it is separated from the Monte Rotondo and Monte Renoso massifs by the valley of the Tavignano river. 
To the northwest it is separated from the Monte Cinto and Monte Astu massifs by the valley of the Golo river.

Peaks
The main peaks are:

Notes

Sources

Mountains of Haute-Corse
Massifs of Corsica